= Sales force =

Sales force may refer to:

- Salesforce.com, an American technology company
- A sales team
